Brendan Guraliuk (born May 14, 2000) is a Canadian field hockey player who plays as a midfielder for German Bundesliga club Der Club an der Alster and the Canada national team. Guraliuk has competed internationally for Canada since 2018.

Career 
Guraliuk competed for Canada at the 2018 Summer Youth Olympics in Buenos Aires. The team finished in 10th.

Olympics
Guraliuk has qualified to represent Canada at the 2020 Summer Olympics.

References

External links
 
 
 
 
 

2000 births
Canadian male field hockey players
Living people
Field hockey players from Vancouver
Male field hockey midfielders
Field hockey players at the 2018 Summer Youth Olympics
UBC Thunderbirds players
Olympic field hockey players of Canada
Field hockey players at the 2020 Summer Olympics
Der Club an der Alster players
Men's Feldhockey Bundesliga players
21st-century Canadian people